This is an incomplete list of rivers of Cuba, arranged from west to east, by coast, with respective tributaries indented under each larger stream's name.

North Coast

Mantua River

Almendares River

Yumurí River
Cormir River
Río de la Palma
Sagua la Grande River
Sagua la Chica River
Río Jatibonico del Norte
Caonao River
Máximo River
Saramaguacán River

Toa River

South Coast

Cuyaguateje River (Guane River)
Guamá River
San Diego River

Mayabeque River
Hanabana River (Amarillas River)
Damují River (Rodas River)
Agabama River (Manatí River)

Río Jatibonico del Sur
Jiquí River

San Pedro River
Najasa River (San Juan de Najasa River)
Tana River

Jobabo River
Cauto River
Salado River
Bayamo River
Contramaestre River
Buey River
Guantánamo River
Jaibo River
Guaso River

References
The Columbia Gazetteer of North America. 2000.
Rand McNally, The New International Atlas, 1993.
, GEOnet Names Server

Cuba
Rivers of Cuba
Cuba